Louis Plaidy (28 November 1810 – 3 March 1874) was a celebrated German piano pedagogue and compiler of books of technical music studies.

Life
Born in Hubertusburg, Saxony, Plaidy initially focused on the violin, and toured as a concert violinist, but he later studied the piano, particularly the technical aspects of playing. Plaidy was renowned for his ability to impart technical skills to his students.

In 1843, Felix Mendelssohn invited Plaidy to join the faculty of the Leipzig Conservatory to teach the piano. The Conservatory attracted many international students, including the original directors of the Oberlin Conservatory (founded in 1867 in Ohio, US), who went on to use Plaidy's piano methods. Plaidy was Edvard Grieg's first piano teacher at the Conservatory, although Grieg found Plaidy's style of teaching uninspiring. Plaidy remained at the Conservatory until 1865, when he went on to teach piano students privately.

Plaidy published a book on piano pedagogy, which was highly thought of and is still used today, and a pamphlet, said to be of little worth.

He died in Grimma, Saxony, aged 63.

Notable students

Plaidy's notable students included:
 Dudley Buck, American composer.
 Hans von Bülow, German conductor, virtuoso pianist, and composer.
 Frederic Hymen Cowen, British composer.
 Gustave Gagnon, Canadian organist and composer.
 Frederick Grant Gleason, American composer and director of the Chicago Conservatory.
 Edvard Grieg, Norwegian composer and pianist.
 Leoš Janáček, Czech composer.
 Michael Maybrick, English singer and composer.
 James Cutler Dunn Parker, American organist, educator and composer.
 Oscar Paul
 Julius Röntgen, German-Dutch composer.
 Ernst Rudorff, German composer.
 Samuel Sanford
 Gustav Schreck, German composer.
 Arthur Sullivan, English composer.

Works

References

1810 births
1874 deaths
19th-century classical pianists
19th-century German musicians
German classical pianists
German music educators
Male classical pianists
Academic staff of the University of Music and Theatre Leipzig
19th-century male musicians